"Big Beautiful Woman" (commonly abbreviated as BBW) is a euphemism for an overweight woman.

Meaning and usage

The terms "Big Beautiful Women" and "BBW" were coined by Carole Shaw in 1979, when she launched BBW Magazine, a fashion and lifestyle magazine for "plus-size" women. BBW Magazine trademarked the term Big Beautiful Woman, which was later transferred to Dimensions Magazine.

Although "BBW" may have been first used in the context of BBW Magazine, the term's usage spread over the years. It has reached the point that even women who have never heard of the magazine have begun to refer to themselves as "BBWs".

The abbreviation BBW can often be found used in personal ads, online dating services, and pornography denoting an identification with (or preference for) such women, and is also used to denote events specifically targeted to such women, and persons interested in them, such as specific gathering nights in dance clubs, restaurants, and fashion stores and shows.

The term is also commonly used as a positive euphemism by those involved with the fat acceptance movement.

The term has several near-synonyms with varying shades of meaning, such as "full-figured", "voluptuous", "zaftig", and "Rubenesque", the latter term referring to the art of Peter Paul Rubens, best known for portraying full-bodied women.

Variants  	
The acronym BBBW stands for Big Beautiful Black Woman. Another variant is SSBBW: Supersized Big Beautiful Woman. There is no formal definition which explains the exact difference between BBW and SSBBW. Some BBWs or SSBBWs consider themselves to be feedees.

Big Handsome Man
Big Handsome Man (BHM), or Big Hulking Men, or sometimes Big Beautiful Man (BBM), refers to a physically or sexually attractive fat man.  Women who are attracted to BHMs are called Female Fat Admirers (FFA). In the gay community, BHMs are sometimes called "chubs", and men who are attracted to BHMs are known as chubby chasers.

See also
 Fat acceptance movement
 Fat fetishism
 Female body shape
 Bear (gay culture)
 Obesity

References

External links

BBW Magazine site
Free site of Dimensions Magazine, previously associated with NAAFA, a "size-positive" lifestyle magazine with resources and forums.
National Association to Advance Fat Acceptance is a non-profit human rights organization dedicated to improving the quality of life for fat people.

Fat acceptance movement
Fat fetishism
Human appearance
Popular culture neologisms
Subcultures